This is the list of cathedrals in the Democratic Republic of the Congo.

Roman Catholic 

Cathedrals of the Roman Catholic Church in the Democratic Republic of the Congo:
 Cathedral of Sts. Peter and Paul in Basankusu
 Cathedral of Our Lady of the Assumption in Boma
 Cathedral of the Holy Cross in Bondo
 Cathedral of Our Lady of Peace in Bukavu
 Cathedral of St. Andrew in Butembo
 Cathedral of St. Joseph in Goma
 Cathédrale Saint Kizito in Idiofa
 Cathedral of St. Albert in Inongo
 Cathedral of Mary the Mediatrix in Isangi
 Cathedral of Christ the King in Kalemie
 Cathedral of St. Joseph Mikalayi in Kazumba
 Cathedral of St. Charles Borromeo in Kasongo
 Cathedral of St. Andrew in Kilwa
 Co-Cathedral of the Holy Cross in Kasenga
 Cathedral of Our Lady in Kinshasa
 Cathedral of Our Lady of the Rosary in Kisangani
 Cathedral of Our Lady of Seven Sorrows in Kisantu
 Cathedral of St. Hermes in Lisala
 Cathedral of Sts. Peter and Paul in Lubumbashi
 Cathedral of St. Eugene in Mbandaka
 Cathedral of St. Anthony of Padua in Molegbe

See also
List of cathedrals
Christianity in the Democratic Republic of the Congo

References

Catholic Church in the Democratic Republic of the Congo
Congo, Democratic Republic of the
Cathedrals in the Democratic Republic of the Congo
Cathedrals
Cathedrals